Chualar (Spanish for "Pigweed grove") is an unincorporated community and census-designated place (CDP) in the Salinas Valley of Monterey County, California, United States. The population was 1,185 at the 2020 census.

Geography
U.S. Route 101 runs along the southwest side of the community, leading northwest to Salinas and southeast  to Soledad.

In her Spanish and Indian Place Names of California (1914), Sanchez states that chualar was the indigenous word for an abundant and native goosefoot. This plant could possibly be Chenopodium californicum, the California goosefoot (also known as pigweed). In his 1500 California Place Names (1998), William Bright writes that the name is Spanish for "where the chual grows," chual being Mexican Spanish for pigweed or goosefoot, and derived ultimately from Nahuatl tzoalli.

History
The Chualar post office opened in 1871, closed in 1873, and re-opened in 1874.

At a railroad crossing about one mile south of town, a bus carrying Mexican migrant workers collided with a train in September 1963, killing 32 passengers and injuring 25. It was the most serious road accident in U.S. history, and helped spur the abolition of the bracero guest worker program. The portion of U.S. Route 101 where the accident occurred was named the "Bracero Memorial Highway" on the 50th anniversary of the accident in 2013. At that time two survivors of the crash were still alive.

On December 4, 2019, a levee near Chualar was partially breached at 2 pm.  Highway 101 was shut down due to the broken levee. Children were stranded at the local school with a few teachers overnight. The levee break also caused a nursing home to be evacuated.

Chualar was once owned by the Johnson family. They ran cattle on their 15,000+ acre ranch.

Demographics

2010
The 2010 United States Census reported that Chualar had a population of 1,190. The racial makeup of Chualar was 337 (28.3%) White, 1 (0.1%) African American, 2 (0.2%) Native American, 11 (0.9%) Asian, 0 (0.0%) Pacific Islander, 827 (69.5%) from other races, and 12 (1.0%) from two or more races. Hispanic or Latino of any race were 1,151 persons (96.7%).

The Census reported that 1,190 people (100% of the population) lived in households, 0 (0%) lived in non-institutionalized group quarters, and 0 (0%) were institutionalized.

There were 245 households, out of which 179 (73.1%) had children under the age of 18 living in them, 160 (65.3%) were opposite-sex married couples living together, 49 (20.0%) had a female householder with no husband present, 22 (9.0%) had a male householder with no wife present.  There were 17 (6.9%) unmarried opposite-sex partnerships, and 4 (1.6%) same-sex married couples or partnerships. 9 households (3.7%) were made up of individuals, and 5 (2.0%) had someone living alone who was 65 years of age or older. The average household size was 4.86.  There were 231 families (94.3% of all households); the average family size was 4.79.

The population was spread out, with 429 people (36.1%) under the age of 18, 137 people (11.5%) aged 18 to 24, 330 people (27.7%) aged 25 to 44, 235 people (19.7%) aged 45 to 64, and 59 people (5.0%) who were 65 years of age or older.  The median age was 26.6 years. For every 100 females, there were 103.1 males.  For every 100 females age 18 and over, there were 95.1 males.

The homeowner vacancy rate was 0%; the rental vacancy rate was 1.5%.  553 people (46.5% of the population) lived in owner-occupied housing units and 637 people (53.5%) lived in rental housing units.

2000
As of the census of 2000, there were 1,444 people, 279 households, and 261 families residing in the CDP. The racial makeup of the CDP was 15.44% White, 0.42% Black or African American, 0.55% Native American, 3.19% Asian, 76.11% from other races, and 4.29% from two or more races.  93.56% of the population were Hispanic or Latino of any race.

There were 279 households, out of which 71.0% had children under the age of 18 living with them, 77.4% were married couples living together, 11.8% had a female householder with no husband present, and 6.1% were non-families. 3.9% of all households were made up of individuals, and 1.8% had someone living alone who was 65 years of age or older.  The average household size was 5.18 and the average family size was 5.22.

In the CDP the population was spread out, with 39.4% under the age of 18, 14.9% from 18 to 24, 30.2% from 25 to 44, 12.0% from 45 to 64, and 3.5% who were 65 years of age or older.  The median age was 23 years. For every 100 females, there were 115.5 males.  For every 100 females age 18 and over, there were 115.5 males.

The median income for a household in the CDP was $43,125, and the median income for a family was $40,000. Males had a median income of $20,667 versus $19,643 for females. The per capita income for the CDP was $10,096.  About 12.4% of families and 15.0% of the population were below the poverty line, including 18.9% of those under age 18 and 8.5% of those age 65 or over.

References

Census-designated places in Monterey County, California
Salinas Valley
Unincorporated communities in Monterey County, California
Unincorporated communities in California